Saint-Germain-au-Mont-d'Or is a commune in the Metropolis of Lyon in Auvergne-Rhône-Alpes region in eastern France.

Geography 
It lies 12 km (7.4 mi) north of Lyon on the right bank of the Saône river.

Sights 
 The medieval castle.

References

External links

Official site

Communes of Lyon Metropolis
Lyonnais